Winiata railway station was a station on the North Island Main Trunk in New Zealand. It was decorated with an archway when the  Mangaweka to Taihape section was opened by the Prime Minister, Richard Seddon, on 21 November 1904.

Only a single track remains through the station site and there is little sign that there was ever a station there.

History 
On 25 January 1904 the sawmillers, Bosher Bros, applied for siding, which cost them about £400. On 17 August 1905 an application was made for passenger trains to stop there and a platform and shelter for passengers were ready by November 1906. H D Bennett took over Bosher's private siding in 1913 and it became a public siding in 1915, when Taihape freezing works was built. They opened a siding on the other side of the line. That works closed in 1925. The platform was raised in 1936. Sheep loading yards were built in 1937 and extended in 1941.

Like the other stations along this part of NIMT, Winiata had freight from several other timber mills, including Bright & Carter, Manawatu Timber Co, Sowersby and Symes. By 1959 only lime, manure and sheep were being carried and the sidings stored stock wagons during the slack season. On 10 August 1959 the station closed to passengers, parcels, and goods in small lots. In 1969 the sheep yards and west siding closed. By 1972 Taihape Bulk Fertilisers had stopped using the station, which was closed on 12 March 1972, after which the sheep yards and station building were dismantled.

References

External links 

 Photo of 1904 archway

Defunct railway stations in New Zealand
Rail transport in Manawatū-Whanganui
Buildings and structures in Manawatū-Whanganui
Railway stations opened in 1904
Railway stations closed in 1972
Rangitikei District
1904 establishments in New Zealand
1972 disestablishments in New Zealand